The Uster–Oetwil tramway (UOeB) was a metre gauge rural electric tramway in the Swiss canton of Zürich. It linked the town of Uster with Esslingen and Oetwil in the Zürcher Oberland.

The UOeB had an interchange with the main line at Uster station, on the Wallisellen to Rapperswil line. Through the FB, the WMB had an indirect metre gauge connection to the Zürich city tram network.

The line was electrified at 800 V DC. Of the lines total length, all but  ran in the street.

The line opened on 28 May 1909. It survived until 10 January 1949, when it was replaced by a bus service operated by the Verkehrsbetriebe Zürichsee und Oberland (VZO).

The line's headquarters and workshops were located near Uster, with an additional depot at Langholz. Both buildings still exists, in other uses, together with a goods shed at Mönchaltorf.

References

External links 
 

Closed railway lines in Switzerland
Metre gauge railways in Switzerland
Tram transport in Switzerland
Transport in the canton of Zürich